Taipei City Constituency II includes all of Datong and most of Shilin in northern Taipei. The district acquired its present boundaries since 2008, when all local constituencies of the Legislative Yuan were reorganized to become single-member districts.

Current district
 Datong
 Shilin: 5 sub-districts
 Shizi: 10 urban villages
 Fushun, Fuguang, Hulu, Hudong, Shezi, Shexin, Sheyuan, Yonglun, Fu'an, Fuzhou
 Hougang: 7 urban villages
 Hougang, Fuzhong, Giangang, Bailing, Chengde, Fuhua, Mingsheng
 Jieshang: 7 urban villages
 Renyong, Yixin, Fude, Fulin, Fuzhi, Jiujia, Fujia
 Zhishanyan: 4 urban villages
 Yanshan, Mingshan, Shengshan, Zhishan
 Yangmingshan: 10 urban villages
 Dangshan, Yangfu, Gangguan, Xin'an, Yangming, Jingshan, Pingdeng, Xishan, Cuishan, Linxi

Legislators

Election results

2008

2012

2016

2019 by-election

References 

Constituencies in Taipei